Marva Josie (born Marva Josie Spurling, December 9, 1939) is an American jazz singer who was the longtime vocalist for Earl Hines.

In 1976 they both played at the White House for President Gerald Ford and later for President Jimmy Carter.

Josie has a -octave range.

Josie was born on December 9, 1939 in Clairton, Pennsylvania to a Jamaican father and a mother from Duquesne, Pennsylvania.

Discography
 1973: Marva Josie With Earl Hines And His Orchestra - This Is Marva Josie
 1977: An Evening With Earl Hines: with Tiny Grimes, Hank Young, Bert Dahlander and Marva Josie: Disques Vogue VDJ-534 
 1977: Earl "Fatha" Hines and Marva Josie – Jazz Is His Old Lady... And My Old Man
 1982: Earl Hines With Marva Josie And The 150 Band - Fatha's Birthday
 1984: Forever Love
 First Church Of Deliverance Choir Featuring Earl "Fatha" Hines*, Marva Josie - Songs Of Deliverance, Volume IV

Singles & EPs
 1962: You Lied 
 1963: I Don't Care
 1965: I Love New York / "Don't" 
 1965: Birthday Fella / Did You Ever Love Someone 
 1966: Crazy Stocking's
 1969: I'm Satisfied - Love's Burning Fire 
 1971: Marva Josie, Earl "Fatha" Hines Quartet - Scarborough Fair
 1973: Marva Josie, Earl Hines And His Orchestra - Social Security - Can She
 1977: Earl "Fatha" Hines* With Marva Josie - Jazz His Old Lady And My Old Man 
 1986: Love You Don't Know Me / Lollipop

References

1939 births
American women jazz singers
American jazz singers
Living people